Waate "Pat" Pene Potaka (c.1903 – 3 November 1967) was a New Zealand rugby union player who represented the All Blacks in 1923 and the Māori All Blacks between 1922 and 1927. He was regarded as a utility back, as he played in every back position throughout his career.

Although his birth name was Waate, Potaka was generally known as Pat.

He was born in Taihape, but was educated at Te Aute College in the Hawke's Bay region.

Career

Provincial 
He initially played as a halfback, but soon found himself playing as a fly half and fullback.

For the majority of his career Potaka played for the Rata club. He had stints at the Aotea and Ratana clubs towards the end of his career.

He totalled 25 games for the Wanganui union.

All Blacks 
After playing in the 1923 North against South Island match, Potaka gained his only two appearances for the All Blacks, both of which were against New South Wales. The first was played in Dunedin and the second in Christchurch where he came on as a substitute onto the wing and then scored a try.

The next year in 1924 Potaka trialled to be selected for the team that would go on to be nicknamed The Invincibles. He was not selected.

Māori All Blacks 
Potaka first played for the Māori All Blacks in 1922.

He was selected for the 1926–27 tour of New Zealand, Australia, Sri Lanka, Europe and Canada. He played in 18 matches on the great tour. Potaka mainly played in the centre position on the tour, but at times was used at fullback and five-eighths.

His total number of games for the Māori All Blacks was 50.

References 

New Zealand rugby union players
New Zealand international rugby union players
1967 deaths
New Zealand Māori people
New Zealand Māori rugby union players
Māori All Blacks players
People educated at Te Aute College
Rugby union players from Manawatū-Whanganui